H. C. Watson House is a historic home located at Rockingham, Richmond County, North Carolina.  It was built about 1885, and remodeled in the early-1900s in the Classical Revival style.  It is a two-story, frame dwelling with a truncated slate hipped roof with a widow's walk and two story pedimented portico with fluted Ionic order columns.  It features a formal wraparound porch and attached porte cochere.  Also on the property are the contributing frame, gabled three-car garage, a small barn, and detached cookhouse.

It was listed on the National Register of Historic Places in 1983.

References

Houses on the National Register of Historic Places in North Carolina
Neoclassical architecture in North Carolina
Houses completed in 1885
Houses in Randolph County, North Carolina
National Register of Historic Places in Richmond County, North Carolina